Marcel Buysse (Wontergem, 11 November 1889- Ghent, 3 October 1939) was a Belgian racing cyclist.

After finishing fourth in the 1912 Tour de France, Buysse led the general classification for two days  until a broken handlebar cost him dearly. Despite winning six stages in the 1913 Tour de France, he could only finish in 3rd place, 3 hours, 30 minutes and 55 seconds behind Philippe Thys.

He finished third in the 1919 Giro d'Italia.

Marcel was the brother of Jules Buysse and Tour de France-winner Lucien Buysse, and the father of cyclists Norbert Buysse and Albert Buysse.

Major results

1910
 Moorslede
1912
Tour de France:
4th place overall classification
1913
Tour de France:
3rd place overall classification
Winner stages 4, 7, 11, 12, 14 and 15
 Stage 3 Ronde van België
1914
 Stage 1 Ronde van België
 Tour of Flanders
1919
Giro d'Italia:
3rd place overall classification
1920
 Six Days of Brussels (with Alfons Spiessens)
1921
 Paris — Dinant
 Arlon — Oostende
1922
 Six Days of Ghent (with Oscar Egg)

References

External links

Belgian male cyclists
Belgian Tour de France stage winners
1889 births
1939 deaths
People from Deinze
Cyclists from East Flanders
20th-century Belgian people